"You Dropped a Bomb on Me" is a funk song performed by the Gap Band, released in 1982 on producer Lonnie Simmons's label, Total Experience Records. In addition to the single release, the song was featured on the band's 1982 album Gap Band IV.

Song information
The song prominently features a synthesizer that imitates the whistling sound of a bomb being dropped. This is first heard once immediately before the first verse, and repeats throughout the song from the fourth chorus onward. The song also features timpani drum rolls.

In the aftermath of the September 11 attacks, the song was one of those named on the 2001 Clear Channel memorandum of "lyrically questionable" songs.

Chart positions and performance
It reached No. 2 on the Billboard R&B charts, No. 39 on the dance charts, and No. 31 on the Billboard Hot 100.

In popular culture
 The song is featured in a Walmart Christmas holiday television commercial that started airing in October 2017.

References

External links
You Dropped a Bomb on Me music video from the Gap Band's Vevo page

1982 singles
Funk songs
The Gap Band songs
Songs written by Lonnie Simmons
Songs written by Charlie Wilson (singer)
Songs written by Rudy Taylor
1982 songs
Memphis Grizzlies
San Francisco Giants